Bolesty may refer to the following places:
Bolesty, Masovian Voivodeship (east-central Poland)
Bolesty, Bielsk County in Podlaskie Voivodeship (north-east Poland)
Bolesty, Suwałki County in Podlaskie Voivodeship (north-east Poland)